Lars Chittka, FLS, FRES, FSB (born April 1963) is a German zoologist, ethologist and ecologist distinguished for his work on the evolution of sensory systems and cognition, using insect-flower interactions as a model.

Life and career 
Born in Germany, Chittka studied Biology at the Georg-August-Universität Göttingen and the Free University of Berlin. He obtained his PhD degree under the supervision of Randolf Menzel at the Free University of Berlin. Chittka is a recipient of the Royal Society Wolfson Research Merit Award and an Advanced Fellowship from the European Research Council (ERC). He is also member of the German National Academy of Sciences Leopoldina, an elected Fellow of the Linnean Society (FLS), the Royal Entomological Society (FRES) as well as the Royal Society of Biology (FSB). He received the Lesley Goodman Award of the Royal Entomological Society in 2006. Lars Chittka has been an Editor of Biology’s foremost open access journal PLoS Biology since 2004, and has also been on the Editorial Board of Proceedings of the Royal Society of London Series B (2010-2012) and the Quarterly Review of Biology (2004-2010); he is a member of the Faculty of 1000, and was a Panel Chairman for the European Research Council (2010-2013). He is also the founder of the Research Centre for Psychology at Queen Mary University of London, where he is a Professor of Sensory and Behavioural Ecology.

Research achievements 
Chittka has carried out extensive work on the behaviour, cognition and ecology of bumblebees and honeybees, and their interactions with flowers. He developed perceptual models of animal colour vision, allowing the derivation of optimal receiver systems as well as a quantification of the evolutionary pressures shaping flower signals. Chittka also made fundamental contributions to the understanding of animal cognition and its fitness benefits in the economy of nature. He explored phenomena such as numerosity, speed-accuracy trade-offs, false memories and social learning in bees. His discoveries have made a substantial impact on the understanding of animal intelligence and its neural-computational underpinnings. He has published over 250 peer-reviewed articles, many of them highly cited.

Science, music and art 
Chittka has been involved in a number of collaborative works linking the science of bees with music and art. With musicians Katie Green and Rob Alexander, he formed the band Killer Bee Queens. In 2019, they released the post-punk inspired concept album Strange Flowers on Bandcamp. Two music videos were published; “I stung Gwyneth Paltrow”  referred to the pseudoscientific method of bee stings as a treatment for minor skin conditions, as advocated by the actress. The video for “The Beekeeper’s Dream” used footage from David Blair's  1991 surrealist film "Wax or the Discovery of Television Among the Bees".

Chittka also worked with installation artist Julian Walker on a project in which live bees’ responses to famous paintings were evaluated (“Do Bees Like Van Gogh’s Sunflowers?”). Chittka and Walker explained that they used “this unconventional approach in the hope to raise awareness for between-species differences in visual perception, and to provoke thinking about the implications of biology in human aesthetics and the relationship between object representation and its biological connotations.”

Data collected by Chittka's team on the life-long radar-tracking of individual bumblebees' flights formed the basis for artwork by Lucy Pullen which was on display at the Perimeter Institute for Theoretical Physics from 2018-2020. Some of the images are now in a collection of the Royal Bank of Canada, Toronto.

Chittka also contributed to a science-music project with artist Aladin Borioli, called “Shared Sensibilities” in which sections of an interview about Chittka’s research were combined with the music of Laurent Güdel and the sounds of honeybees, aired on BBC Radio 6 in 2020.

Bibliography

Journal articles: most highly cited

Journal articles: recent

Books

References 

20th-century German zoologists
Animal cognition writers
German ecologists
Fellows of the Royal Entomological Society
1963 births
Living people
21st-century German zoologists